Jermaine Edward Lewis (born October 16, 1974) is an American former professional football player who was a wide receiver in the National Football League (NFL). He was selected in the fifth round (153rd overall) of the 1996 NFL Draft by the Baltimore Ravens, who he played for until 2001. With the Ravens, he won Super Bowl XXXV over the New York Giants. He played college football for the Maryland Terrapins.

In his career Lewis also played for the Houston Texans and Jacksonville Jaguars.

Early years
Lewis attended Eleanor Roosevelt High School, where he was a two-time team MVP as a running back, while also as a sprinter on the track team, setting a national high school record in the 200 meters in 1992.

College career
Lewis was a four-year starter at Maryland, where he set several ACC records, including a record 193 receptions.

Track and field

Lewis was also a track star at Maryland, where he competed in the 100 meters and 200 meters, posting personal bests of 10.33 seconds and 20.82 seconds, respectively.

Personal bests

Professional career
Lewis was selected by the Baltimore Ravens in the fifth round (153rd overall) of the 1996 NFL Draft. As a rookie, he established himself as the team's kick and punt returner, as well as their slot receiver.

From 1996 to 2001, Lewis scored 23 touchdowns (a franchise record passed by Jamal Lewis in 2003) and made the Pro Bowl in 1998 and 2001 as a returner. He led the NFL in punt return average in 1997 with 15.6 yards-per-return, punt return yards in 2001 with 519, and punt return touchdowns in 1998 and 2000 with two. In the Ravens 34–7 win over the New York Giants in Super Bowl XXXV, he had 152 all-purpose yards (111 kickoff return yards, 34 punt return yards, seven receiving yards, one rushing yard), including an 84-yard kickoff return for a touchdown in the second half that put the game out of reach.

In the 2002 expansion draft, Lewis was selected sixth by the Houston Texans, carrying a salary cap figure of US$4.29 million. However, he was released by the Texans after just one season. He then played for the Jacksonville Jaguars in 2003 and 2004 before being allocated to NFL Europe.

Lewis finished his nine NFL seasons with 148 rushing yards, 143 receptions for 2,129 yards, 295 punt returns for 3,282 yards, and 4,611 yards on kickoff returns. Overall, he recorded 10,170 total all-purpose yards and scored 23 touchdowns (17 receiving, six punt returns). With the Ravens, he gained 8,001 all-purpose yards, which stood as a franchise record until surpassed by Jamal Lewis in 2006.  His 3,282 punt return yards ranked him 7th on the NFL all-time list.

NFL career statistics

Regular season

Playoffs

Awards and highlights
 Super Bowl champion (XXXV)
 2x Pro Bowl (1998, 2001)
 First-team All-Pro (1998)
 Second-team All-Pro (2001)
 3x AFC Special Teams Player of the Week (Week 15, 1997; Week 4, 1998; Week 17, 2000)
 2x AFC Special Teams Player of the Month (September 1998; December 2000)

Ravens franchise records
 Most career punt return yards (2,730)
 Most career punt return touchdowns (6)
 Most career punt returns (231)
 Most career All-purpose yards (8,001)
 Most career kickoff returns (139)

Personal life
Lewis has three sons. He also had a child named Geronimo, who was stillborn in 2000.  Lewis has a charity in honor of Geronimo called the Geronimo Lewis Foundation.

On August 15, 2011, Lewis was arrested and charged with resisting arrest by the Baltimore County Police Department.  The arrest occurred after a hit and run car accident.  Lewis was arrested again on February 16, 2012.

References

External links
  NFL.com All-time player page
 Yahoo Player Page
 Stats at Pro Football Reference

1974 births
Living people
American football wide receivers
American football return specialists
Baltimore Ravens players
Jacksonville Jaguars players
Houston Texans players
American Conference Pro Bowl players
Amsterdam Admirals players
Frankfurt Galaxy players
Maryland Terrapins football players
Dallas Desperados players
People from Lanham, Maryland
Players of American football from Maryland